This list of defunct medical schools in the United States includes former medical schools that previously awarded either the Doctor of Medicine (MD) or Doctor of Osteopathic Medicine (DO) degree, either of which is required to become a physician in the United States. MD-granting medical schools are accredited by the Liaison Committee on Medical Education, while DO-granting medical schools are accredited by the American Osteopathic Association Commission on Osteopathic College Accreditation.

See also 
 Medical school in the United States
 Medical education in the United States
 List of medical schools in the United States

References

External links 
 American Association of Colleges of Osteopathic Medicine accredited medical schools
 Liaison Committee on Medical Education accredited medical schools
 Medical school seeking Liaison Committee on Medical Education accreditation

Medical schools in the United States
Medical school
Medical school
United States